Saints Crispin and Crispinian are the Christian patron saints of cobblers, curriers, tanners, and leather workers. They were beheaded during the reign of Diocletian; the date of their execution is given as 25 October 285 or 286.

History
Born to a noble Roman family in the 3rd century AD, Crispin and Crispinian fled persecution for their faith, ending up at Soissons, where they preached Christianity to the Gauls while making shoes by night. It is stated that they were twin brothers.

They earned enough by their trade to support themselves and also to aid the poor. Their success attracted the ire of Rictus Varus, governor of Belgic Gaul, who had them tortured and thrown into the river with millstones around their necks. Though they survived, they were beheaded by the Emperor  286.

Veneration
The feast day of Saints Crispin and Crispinian is 25 October. Although this feast was removed from the Roman Catholic Church's universal liturgical calendar following the Second Vatican Council, the two saints are still commemorated on that day in the most recent edition of the Roman Church's martyrology.

In the sixth century, a stately basilica was erected at Soissons over these saints' graves, and St. Eligius, a famous goldsmith, made a costly shrine for the head of St. Crispinian. Their remains were afterwards removed, partly by Charlemagne to Osnabrück, and partly to the church of San Lorenzo in Panisperna in Rome.

They are the patron saints of cobblers, glove makers, lace makers, lace workers, leather workers, saddle makers, saddlers, shoemakers, tanners, and weavers. Especially in France, but also in England and in other parts of Europe, the festival of St Crispin was for centuries the occasion of solemn processions and merry-making, in which guilds of shoemakers took the chief part.
Crispin and Crispinian are remembered in the Church of England with a commemoration on 25 October.

Cultural references
The Battle of Agincourt was fought on Saint Crispin's feastday. Shakespeare's St. Crispin's Day Speech (sometimes called the "Band Of Brothers" Speech) from his play Henry V has immortalized the day. Also, for the Midsummer's Day Festival in the third act of Die Meistersinger, Wagner has the shoemakers' guild enter singing a song of praise to St. Crispin.

A 16th century legend links them to the town of Faversham, Kent, England. A plaque at Faversham commemorates their association with the town. They are also celebrated in the name of the old pub "Crispin and Crispianus" at Strood in Kent.

See also
St Crispin Street Fair
Daughters of St. Crispin
Order of the Knights of St. Crispin
City livery companies

Footnotes

External links
St Crispin and St Crispinian in Faversham, Kent

286 deaths
3rd-century births
3rd-century Christian saints
3rd-century Gallo-Roman people
Christian martyrs executed by decapitation
Gallo-Roman saints
Groups of Christian martyrs of the Roman era
Shoemakers
Sibling duos
Anglican saints
Patron saints